The Lakshmi Narayan Temple, dedicated to the Hindu God Lakshminarayan, is located in the Ujjayanta Palace ground in the city of Agartala, Tripura state, India.

History
The temple was constructed by the King of Tripura, Birendra Kishore Manikya (r. 1909–1923), a century ago

See also

References

External links

Hindu temples in Tripura
Vishnu temples
Buildings and structures in Agartala